Saye Zerbo (27 August 1932 – 19 September 2013) was a Burkinabé military officer who was the third President of the Republic of Upper Volta (now Burkina Faso) from 25 November 1980 until 7 November 1982. 

He led a coup in 1980, but was resisted by trade unions and was overthrown by Major Jean-Baptiste Ouédraogo and the Council of Popular Salvation (CSP).

Biography
Saye Zerbo was born Tougan, French West Africa, on 27 August 1932. He went to school in Mali and Saint-Louis, Senegal. Then he joined the French military in 1950 and attended the military academy Saint-Cyr. As a paratrooper, Zerbo took part in both the First Indochina War and the Algerian War of Independence. After Upper Volta's independence from France in 1960, he transferred to that country's army in 1961.

In the military government of Sangoulé Lamizana, who ruled Upper Volta from 1966, Saye Zerbo was minister of foreign affairs from 1974 to 1976. He also held the positions of commander of the regiment in the capital Ouagadougou and director of the military intelligence agency.

On 25 November 1980, Zerbo staged a coup against President Lamizana, who had been re-elected democratically in 1978, and took on the positions of head of state and government. The constitution, which had been introduced in 1977, was suspended and the Military Committee of Recovery for National Progress (Comité Militaire de Redressement pour le Progrès National; CMPRN) established. The trade unions in the country opposed his seizure of power, although they had supported Zerbo for a long time, and on 7 November 1982, Saye Zerbo was deposed in another coup d'état. He was succeeded by Jean-Baptiste Ouédraogo as the head of the Council of Popular Salvation (Conseil du Salut du Peuple; CSP).

After being deposed, Zerbo was also incarcerated. On 4 August 1983, Ouédraogo was deposed by Thomas Sankara. In May 1984, Zerbo and Lamizana were put on trial for various crimes. Zerbo was sentenced to 15 years in prison. During his imprisonment, Zerbo converted from Islam to Christianity. He was released from jail in August 1985. After Blaise Compaoré had deposed Sankara he sought Zerbo's advice. Zerbo's conviction from 1984 was annulled on 18 February 1997 by the supreme court of Burkina Faso.

Zerbo's third daughter Araba Kadidiatou Zerbo is married to the former Prime Minister of Burkina Faso Paramanga Ernest Yonli.

External links 
 Le faso article about Zerbo

Citations 

École Spéciale Militaire de Saint-Cyr alumni
French military personnel of the First Indochina War
French military personnel of the Algerian War
People of French West Africa
Burkinabé military personnel
Burkinabé former Muslims
Burkinabé politicians
Heads of state of Burkina Faso
Prime Ministers of Burkina Faso
Foreign ministers of Burkina Faso
Leaders who took power by coup
Leaders ousted by a coup
1932 births
Burkinabé prisoners and detainees
Prisoners and detainees of Burkina Faso
Burkinabé Christians
Converts to Christianity from Islam
2013 deaths
People from Boucle du Mouhoun Region
21st-century Burkinabé people